Bodianus trilineatus, the fourline hogfish, is a species of wrasse. 
It is found in the Western Indian Ocean.

Size

References

trilineatus
Fish of the Indian Ocean

Taxa named by Henry Weed Fowler
Fish described in 1934